Ariane Schluter (born 1 February 1966) is a Dutch actress. She is best known for playing in films by such Dutch filmmakers as Alex van Warmerdam and Theo van Gogh.

Career 
Ariane Schluter studied at the Maastricht Academy of Dramatic Arts. After finishing her studies, she played in various theater plays. In 1994 she was a co-writer of the script for 06, which was filmed by Theo Van Gogh and won a special Jury Price at the Netherlands Film Festival. Another famous Dutch filmmaker – Alex van Warmerdam – did several films starring Ariane Schluter: The Dress (1996), Little Tony (1998), Waiter (2006).

From 2015 till 2016 she was part of the film jury for ShortCutz Amsterdam. An annual film festival promoting short films in Amsterdam, The Netherlands. Other jury members include Rutger Hauer, Roel Reine and Jan Harlan.

Filmography 

 06 (aka 1-900 (Sex Without Hangups)) (1994) by Theo van Gogh
 Once Beaten, Twice Shy (Eenmaal geslagen, nooit meer bewogen) (1995)
 The Shadow Walkers (De Schaduwlopers) (1995)
 The Dress (De Jurk) (1996) by Alex van Warmerdam
 The Stowaway (De Verstekeling) (1997)
 Little Tony (Kleine Teun) (1998) by Alex van Warmerdam
 Resistance (2003)
 Schat (2004)
 06/05 (2004) by Theo van Gogh
 Johan (2005)
 Waiter (2006) by Alex van Warmerdam
 Pandora's la (2007)
 The Dark House (2009)
 Matterhorn (2013)
 Accused (2014)
 Instinct (2019)

Awards & nominations 
 1994 – Nomination Golden Calf Best Actress, Nederlands Film Festival, for 06
 2015 – Golden Calf Best Actress in a TV-Drama, Nederlands Film Festival, for Een goed leven
 2015 – Nomination Golden Calf Best Actress, Nederlands Film Festival, for Accused

References

External links 

1966 births
Living people
Dutch film actresses
People from Voorburg
Golden Calf winners
Maastricht Academy of Dramatic Arts alumni
Dutch stage actresses
20th-century Dutch actresses
21st-century Dutch actresses